Phyllocnistis selenopa is a moth of the family Gracillariidae, known from Guadalcanal, in the Solomon Islands, as well as India and Sri Lanka. The hostplant for the species is Melia azedarach.

References

Phyllocnistis
Moths of Japan